United Express Flight 5925, operated by Great Lakes Airlines with a Beechcraft 1900 twin turboprop, was a regularly scheduled flight from Chicago O'Hare International Airport to Quincy, Illinois, with an intermediate stop in Burlington, Iowa. On November 19, 1996, the aircraft collided on landing at Quincy with another Beechcraft, a private King Air, that was taking off from an intersecting runway. The crash was known as the Quincy runway disaster. Fourteen people (twelve on board the 1900 and two on board the King Air) were killed as a result.

Accident

United Express Flight 5925 had departed from Chicago at 15:25, with Captain Kate Gathje (30), First Officer Darren McCombs (24), and ten passengers. After a stop at Burlington, Iowa, the flight proceeded to Quincy. Two aircraft at Quincy were ready for departure when Flight 5925 was on approach. Both aircraft, a Beechcraft King Air and a Piper Cherokee were proceeding to Runway 4. As Quincy is a non-towered airport, all three aircraft were communicating on the Common Traffic Advisory Frequency. On approach, Captain Gathje inquired as to whether the King Air would hold short of the runway, or depart before their arrival. After receiving no response, Gathje called again and received a reply from the Cherokee that they were holding short of Runway 4. However, because of a simultaneous sound emitted by the ground proximity warning system in the  cockpit, only part of the transmission was received by the 1900. As a result,  the United Express crew misunderstood the transmission as an indication that both the King Air and the Cherokee would not take off until after Flight 5925 had cleared the runway.

Assuming that both planes were holding short, Flight 5925 landed on Runway 13. However, the King Air had taxied into position on Runway 4 and had begun its takeoff roll when Flight 5925 landed. Both aircraft collided at the intersection of Runways 4 and 13. All 12 aboard the United Express flight survived the initial impact but were trapped inside by a jammed door. Several pilots in the vicinity of the crash came to the scene but were unable to open the doors of the aircraft before both planes were destroyed by fire. All 12 aboard Flight 5925 and both pilots of the King Air, Neal Reinwald (63) and Laura Winkleman Brooks (34), died from smoke inhalation.

Cause

The National Transportation Safety Board determined that the cause of the accident was the King Air pilots' failure to effectively monitor both the common frequency and to scan for traffic. A contributing factor was the Cherokee's transmission at the same time as the United Express transmission. Lack of adequate rescue and firefighting equipment was cited as a factor in the high fatality rate.

In popular culture
The crash was featured in the 15th season of the television documentary series Mayday in an episode titled "Fatal Transmission", which featured interviews with witnesses and accident investigators and a dramatic reenactment of the crash.

See also 

 Los Angeles runway disaster
 Tenerife airport disaster
 Linate Airport disaster
 Madrid runway disaster
1990 Wayne County Airport runway collision
TWA Flight 427
Air Canada Flight 759

References

External links

 
 NTSB Response to Petition for Reconsideration from Mr. Ed Voorhis

Accidents and incidents involving the Beechcraft 1900
Accidents and incidents involving the Beechcraft King Air
Airliner accidents and incidents in Illinois
Adams County, Illinois
Aviation accidents and incidents in 1996
Runway incursions
5925
Great Lakes Airlines accidents and incidents
1996 in Illinois
Aviation accidents and incidents in the United States in 1996
Airliner accidents and incidents involving ground collisions
November 1996 events in the United States
Fire disasters involving barricaded escape routes
Airliner accidents and incidents caused by pilot error
Quincy, Illinois